Dorstenia gigas is a species of flowering plant in the Moraceae family. It is a succulent native to the Socotra Islands off the Horn of Africa.

References 

gigas
Caudiciform plants
Endemic flora of Socotra
Taxa named by Isaac Bayley Balfour
Taxa named by Georg August Schweinfurth